Nakaima (written: 仲井眞 or なかいま in hiragana) is a Japanese surname. Notable people with the surname include:

 (born 1939), Japanese businessman and politician
 (born 1960), Japanese manga artist

Japanese-language surnames